Tan Yock Lin PBM PBS is a Singaporean law professor at the National University of Singapore. He is renowned for his numerous texts on conflict-of-law related issues, criminal procedure and the legal profession.

Education and career
Tan read engineering at Imperial College and law at the University of Oxford. He had previously worked at the Economic Development Board and the Monetary Authority of Singapore before becoming a law professor in 2000.

In August 2008, Tan was awarded the Public Service Medal (PBM) during the National Day Awards for his work in law reform with the Singapore Academy of Law. When asked to say a few words about the award, he said, “Law reform is tremendously exciting and I am truly thankful to have been given the opportunity to work with and learn from some of the country’s most informed and forward legal minds.”

In 2010, Tan was appointed as the inaugural Geoffrey Bartholomew Professor. On his appointment, NUS Law Dean Tan Cheng Han noted, "It is befitting that the inaugural appointee is Professor Tan Yock Lin. Besides sharing a deep practice in the law, both Professor Tan and Professor Bartholomew started out as economists. Though their paths may not quite have crossed, each has left indelible footprints for the rest of us to follow. Just as Professor Bartholomew had touched many lives in his time at the University, Prof Tan continues to share his wealth of experience and knowledge with many of our law students." The professorship title was succeeded by Jeffrey Pinsler. In 2021, he was appointed an Emeritus Professor at NUS. He received the Long Service Medal in 2013.

works

 - updating resource

References

Alumni of Imperial College London
Academic staff of the National University of Singapore Faculty of Law
Recipients of the Pingat Bakti Masyarakat
Singaporean Christians